Helmz (stylized as HELMS) is a sports bicycle from Bridgestone Cycle Co., Ltd. jointly developed with fashion brand narifuri.

Overview 
Bridgestone Cycle's 60th anniversary model was developed as "bicycle to be a part of fashion" with narifuri taking charge in frame design and concept establishment. It is made with an "approach to create focus on design ". The model was announced in 2009 and was sold starting in 2010.

The name HELMZ was taken from the English term "helm."

Custom-designed original parts were made for HELMZ, by Japanese cycle part brands such as NITTO, MKS Pedal, and Sugino. Japanese oriented brand parts were selected carefully to minimize the use of Shimano parts.

These original parts of HELMZ  are sold as aftermarket cycle products. The entire sales plan, including the package design of selling boxes and POP, was awarded the Minister of Economy Award and Planning Award in 42nd JPM Creative Design Show in 2012. SR1 received Good Design award in 2014.

Technical features

Air pressure formed aluminum frame 

The frame was based on a Top tube, sloped, low-front design from narifuri and was manufactured using superplastic forming) which molds the frame by inflating high air pressure in the 7005 aluminum pipe. Bridgestone cycle usually used this manufacturing method to improve riding performance, but in HELMZ it was necessary to realize the design.

Wheels 

The texture and rim height differ in front and rear wheels. The front wheel is silver with 35mm rim height. The rear wheel is black with 38 mm rim height. Models with high-performance sports wheels were launched afterward.

Thumb shifter 

For models with gear shifts, the Thumb shifter was selected. This shifter is operated with the thumb unlike the typical modern sports bicycle push bar mechanical shift.

Original aftermarket parts 

Hlmz original aftermarket parts were released on 2012. Stem, handle bar, saddle, wheels, gear cranks, and most other original parts were sold on market as aftermarket parts.

Belt drive 

The belt drive equipped models, SR1 and S10, were introduced in 2013. These models were an update of Bridegestone's belt drive experience from 1980, "SSSD" (Selectable SS Solld Drive). The new belt drives were made out of carbon instead of kevlar making the belts lighter and more flexible.

Models 
Frame shape and concepts have not been changed since its first announcement except for the new sizes being set.

Collaboration

Star Wars 
Collaborating with Star Wars, Helmz released two 5 year anniversary models in different colors. The Galactic Empire model is black based with blue, while the Rebel Alliance model is Silver based with red. The bikes were hand painted at the Bridgestone Cycle headquarter factory.

Awards 
2013 Planning: JPM Minister of Economy Award in 42nd JPM Creative Design Show for Year 2012

2014 SR1: Good Design award 2014 

2016 SR1: selected as  "JAPANESE DESIGN TODAY 100"  in Singapore

References

External links 
 HELMZ Official website

Bridgestone
Bicycle framebuilders